The Staatstheater am Gärtnerplatz (State Theatre at Gärtnerplatz), commonly called the Gärtnerplatztheater, is an opera house and opera company in Munich. (The "Gärtnerplatz" is an urban square in the borough Ludwigsvorstadt-Isarvorstadt.) Designed by Michael Reiffenstuel, it opened on 4 November 1865 as the city's second major theatre after the National Theatre.

At times exclusively concerned with operetta, in recent years there have also been productions of opera, musicals and ballet. The scope of activities is similar to that of the Komische Oper in Berlin and the English National Opera in London.

One of the most active theatres in Germany, its season lasts from September to July and comprises more than 200 performances.  The current intendant is Josef Ernst Köpplinger.

History 
In 1863, a committee for the founding of a Volkstheater (people's theatre) formed. Ludwig II of Bavaria authorized a new building in the borough Isarvorstadt on 10 May 1864. It was designed by Franz Michael Reiffenstuel, who modelled it after the Nationaltheater in classicist style. The groundbreaking was on 25 August 1864, and the Richtfest was celebrated on 27 May 1865. The house was opened on 4 November 1865, with Duke Maximilian Joseph in Bavaria representing the king. The opening performance was a Prologue followed by an allegorical festive play (Festspiel) by Hermann Schmid, Was wir wollen (What we want), with music by “.

The house, intended to show a different repertory than the court theatre, met with financial problems, under frequently changing directors. It had to be sold in March 1870, went first to the former director Friedrich Engelken, shortly thereafter to the architect and a partner, who bought it for the king, who acquired it officially in May 1870. It was reopened on 1 October 1870, directed by Hermann von Schmid. In 1873, Ludwig II granted it the name "Königliches Theater am Gärtnerplatz" (Royal theatre at the Gärtnerplatz). From 1877,   directed the house and also the Hoftheater. The 1878/79 season was especially splendid but resulted in a large deficit. Perfall therefore focused on the Hoftheater, and was succeeded by Georg Lang. The theatre dropped the royal emblem and was called "Theater am Gärtnerplatz".

During World War I, several charity performances were given for the Kriegsfonds and social organisations.

When the theatre was built, the focus was on operetta, then a new genre. Singspiele, light operas with spoken dialogue in German, were also performed. When the house opened as a royal theatre, Jacques Offenbach's Salon Pitzelberger was played, titled Eine musikalische Soirée in der Vorstadt (A musical soiree in the suburb). Some operettas received their world premiere, including Carl Zeller's Die Fornarina on 18 October 1879, starring , Agnes Lang-Ratthey,  and Max Hofpauer. At the end of 1892, a Völkerschau (People's Show), Die Amazonen von Dahomey, appeared with people from Africa for several weeks.

From 1899, the theatre played mainly operettas and was regarded as one of the leading houses for the genre in Germany. Fanny zu Reventlow was engaged for a short time. Magda Schneider appeared at the end of the 1920s, complaining that she had to perform up to 48 times a month for a laughable salary ("für eine lächerliche Gage bis zu achtundvierzig mal im Monat auf der Bühne"). Some Possen and Volksstücke were presented until the 1930s, when the Nazi regime banned performances by Jewish writers, librettists and composers, and demanded that the theatre serve as a venue exclusively for operettas, as the operetta was an excellent means of familiarizing the ordinary citizen with the theater arts ("ausschließlich zur Aufführungsstätte von Operetten, weil… die Operette ein sehr wesentliches Mittel ist, um den Volksgenossen an die Theaterkunst heranzuführen").

In April 1937, the state of Bavaria became owner of the theatre. Plans to replace it with a new building were not realised, but the house was restored. The reopening of the only state operetta house in Germany on 20 November 1937 presented Die Fledermaus by Johann Strauss, with Adolf Hitler in the audience. From 1938, Fritz Fischer was the intendant and Peter Kreuder was the music director. Fischer showed a new style, influenced by Berlin revues and filmed operettas, with mass scenes, opulent staging and fast action. Gitta. Eine Fahrt ins Blaue, a Lustspieloperette composed by Bernhard Stimmler and Carl Michalski, premiered on 18 May 1942, presenting the new style. Die lustige Witwe was also played, the declared favourite operetta of Hitler, who attended the theatre frequently.

On 21 April 1945, the theatre was badly damaged by the last bombing of Munich. Shortly after the war, performances were held at a Schornstraße location, and the restored theatre was reopened on 19 June 1948, playing Eine Nacht in Venedig by Johann Strauss. The Gärtnerplatztheater was able to secure Gustaf Gründgens to stage, as a guest, Offenbach's Die Banditen (The Bandits), first performed on 6 July 1949, with Gründgens playing a major role ("mit intellektuell-komödantischer Bravour"). The theatre played mainly popular works, including Millöcker's Der Bettelstudent, Abraham's Viktoria und ihr Husar, Kálmán's Die Csárdásfürstin with Sári Barabás in the title role, and Gräfin Mariza, Zeller's Der Vogelhändler, and Lehár's Das Land des Lächelns, with Elisabeth Biebl as Mi and Harry Friedauer as Gustl. The world premiere of Burkhard's Das Feuerwerk, staged by Erik Charell on 16 May 1950, was noticed well beyond Munich.

From 1952 to 1955, who also directed the Bayerische Staatsoper, led the theatre. He initiated the performance of operas, but with the ensemble of the State Opera. The chief conductor is Anthony Bramall (since 2017), and the director of dance is Karl Alfred Schreiner (since 2012).

In 1955, the first musical was performed at the Gärtnerplatz, the German premiere of Harold Rome's Fanny, with Christine Görner and Trude Hesterberg in leading roles. It was followed a year later by Cole Porter's Kiss Me, Kate with Johannes Heesters. Loewe's My Fair Lady was performed in 1984, staged by August Everding and with Cornelia Froboess as Eliza Doolittle. In 1957, the theatre showed the first performance in Munich of Stravinsky's opera The Rake's Progress. World premieres of operas included 's Daniel in 1994, Avet Terterian's Das Beben in 2003, and Wilfried Hiller Der Flaschengeist in 2014, among others.

The theatre was closed in 2012 for extensive restoration. It was reopened on 15 October 2017 with a gala performance followed by a new production of Die lustige Witwe on 19 October.

References

Cited sources

External links 

 
 History (in German)
 München: Staatstheater am Gärtnerplatz (historic images) andreas-praefcke.de
 Bavarian State Theatres km.bayern.de

German opera companies
Opera houses in Germany
Historicist architecture in Munich
Theatres in Munich
1865 establishments in Bavaria
Theatres completed in 1865
Music venues completed in 1865